The Gatehouse is a Grade II listed public house in Norwich, England.

It was built in 1934 for the Norwich-based Morgans Brewery, and replaced a 19th-century building of the same name. The builders were a local company, R.G. Carter. The architect has not yet been identified.

It was Grade II listed in 2015 by Historic England.

References

Pubs in Norwich
Grade II listed pubs in Norfolk
Pubs in Norfolk